Three Studies for a Portrait of Henrietta Moraes is an oil on canvas 1963 triptych by the Irish-born British figurative painter Francis Bacon. It is one of a series of portraits he painted of his friends, at a time when his art was becoming more personal. Henrietta Moraes (1933–1999) was a close friend and drinking companion of Bacon's from the early 1960s, and became one of his favourite models. She never posed in person for him; instead he worked either from memory, or more often off photographs commissioned from his friend John Deakin.

Comparing the panels to Giorgione's self-portrait in the Herzog Anton Ulrich Museum, Brunswick, art critic John Russell wrote, "This is the most ... that can be said in painting at this time about human beauty".

Description

Three Studies for a Portrait of Henrietta Moraes is one of Bacon's most intimate portraits, described by art critic John Russell as a portrait of a person known by the artist "as minutely as one human being can know another". The frames are not intended as a narrative, that is not intended to be read from left to right. More Bacon sought to capture different aspects of her appearance, and to reveal her, as he put it, in the 'most elemental state'.

Each panel shows a tightly cropped image of Moraes' head. She fills each of the small canvases, with the background reduced to areas of flat black paint. Her face is contorted to varying degrees in each, a technique reminiscent of some of Picasso's late period female portraits. In fact, the distortions of Bacon's panels are restrained by the standards of his late 60s and early 70s portraits, in which of some the sitter's faces disappears completely, replaced by eye sockets, or smears of broad paint representing caved in cheek or jaw bones. Consistent with this approach, some of Moraes' features are depicted with a heightened intensity, while others are "obliterated".

This relative restraint adds to the stately dignity of this work. Bacon did not intend his distortions or chromatic swirls - often applied by a brush with a towel- as is often assumed, as gratuitous indicators of violence or despair, more they were to indicate the effects of time, age and life on the sitter's physical features. In these works, one of Moraes' eyes is enlarged and fixed squarely on the viewer as the rest of her face melts into chaos. Art historian Lawrence Gowling describes the painting in terms of an attempt to capture the "pigment-figment" of close friends. While using tools such as towels to apply broad streaks of paint was chancy and indicated the gambler aspect to his personality, Bacon was sustained by a painterly ability built up by over 25 years as an artist.

References

Sources

 Davies, Hugh; Yard, Sally. Francis Bacon. New York: Cross River Press, 1986. 
 Farr, Dennis; Peppiatt, Michael; Yard, Sally. Francis Bacon: A Retrospective. New York: Harry N Abrams, 1999. 
 Muir, Robin. A Maverick Eye: The Street Photography of John Deakin. London: Thames & Hudson, 2002 
 Russell, John. Francis Bacon. New York: Norton, 1971. 

1963 paintings
Modern paintings
Paintings by Francis Bacon